Kokutai is a Japanese term. It may refer to:

 Kokutai, a Japanese word used during the second half of the 19th century and first half of the 20th century to refer to the emperor sovereignty
 Kokutai, a Japanese abbreviation for the 
 Kokutai-ji, 
 Kōkūtai (Naval Air Group), a type of aerial combat unit used by the Imperial Japanese Navy Air Service during World War II. Current Japan Air Self Defense Force.